This is the list of Asian Games records in shooting, current after the 2018 Asian Games.

Men

Pistol

Rifle

Running target

Shotgun

Women

Pistol

Rifle

Running target

Shotgun

Mixed

Pistol

Rifle

Shotgun

References

 ISSF Results

External links
 Asian Shooting Federation

Records
Shooting
Shooting records
Sport shooting-related lists